Dave Kelly is a Canadian host, writer, actor, and interviewer.

Career 
He is currently the host of “Dave Kelly Live,” a live talk show that features many of Canada's most notable performers, athletes, and personalities. Featured guests have included Jann Arden, Paul Brandt, Amber Marshall, George Canyon, Jocelyn Alice, Hayley Wickenheiser, Tom Jackson, Cassie Campbell, and Ian Tyson.

Early on in his career, he was one of the actors in the talent pool for English dub studio Blue Water Studios. 

In 2018, Kelly was chosen to be the moderator for ‘A Conversation with Ellen DeGeneres’ in a number of major cities across Canada, where he led a one-on-one interview with Ellen in front of 15,000 people.

Kelly hosted ‘The Big Breakfast’ on A-Channel in 1997 and then Breakfast Television on CityTV.

Kelly is the co-founder of Kelly Brothers Productions, a content company based in Calgary and Toronto, specializing in video and live events. He is also an active philanthropist, currently on the board for the United Way of Calgary and co-chair for its $56-million fundraising campaign.

He lives in Calgary, Alberta, Canada with his wife and two children.

Filmography

References

External links
Dave Kelly's site
Dave Kelly at Crystal Acids Database

Year of birth missing (living people)
Living people
Canadian television hosts
Canadian male voice actors
Male actors from Alberta